Down and dirty or Down and Dirty may refer to:

 "down and dirty", term used in stud poker
 A primarily Canadian synonym for a Cuba Libre
 Down and Dirty (book), 1988 book in the Wild Cards anthology series
 "Down and Dirty", song from Quiet Riot's 1986 album QR III
 Down and Dirty, Richard Pryor album
 Down and Dirty (album), The Click album
 Down and Dirty (film), 1976 film directed by Ettore Scola
 Down 'n Dirty, 2001 film featuring Gary Busey
 "Down and Dirty", song from the 1995 Bad Company album Company of Strangers
 "Down and Dirty", a song by Keyshia Cole from her 2005 album The Way It Is